Randy Phillips (born September 14, 1987) is a former American football safety. He played college football at Miami (FL) and was signed by the Detroit Lions as an undrafted free agent in 2010.

Phillips was released by the Lions on August 17, 2011.

References

External links
Detroit Lions bio
Miami Hurricanes bio
Just Sports Stats

1987 births
Living people
American football safeties
Miami Hurricanes football players
Detroit Lions players
Sacramento Mountain Lions players